Saptha pronubana is a moth in the family Choreutidae. It was described by Snellen in 1877. It is found on Java and Sulawesi.

References

Natural History Museum Lepidoptera generic names catalog

Choreutidae
Moths described in 1877